Mabra is a genus of moths of the family Crambidae. It is placed in the tribe Portentomorphini of the subfamily Pyraustinae. The nine species of the genus are mainly distributed in tropical Asia, but M. metallescens and M. russoi are found in tropical Central and South America.

The larval host plant is known for only one species, M. eryxalis, which feeds on Phyllanthus urinaria in the Phyllanthaceae family.

Species
Mabra elephantophila Bänziger, 1985
Mabra eryxalis (Walker, 1859)
Mabra fauculalis Walker, 1859
Mabra fuscipennalis Hampson, 1897
Mabra haematophaga Bänziger, 1985
Mabra lacriphaga Bänziger, 1985
Mabra metallescens (C. Felder, R. Felder & Rogenhofer, 1875)
Mabra nigriscripta Swinhoe, 1895
Mabra russoi Schaus, 1940

Former species
Mabra charonialis (Walker, 1859), now placed in Dolicharthria
Mabra garzettalis (C. Felder, R. Felder & Rogenhofer, 1875), now placed in Blepharomastix

References

Crambidae genus list at Butterflies and Moths of the World of the Natural History Museum

Pyraustinae
Crambidae genera
Taxa named by Frederic Moore